Qaleh Qazi (also Romanized as Qal’eh Qāẕī, Qal‘eh-i-Qāzi, Qal’eh Qāzī, and Qal‘eh-ye Qāzī; also known as Qal’eh Qāzī-ye Bālā) is a city in Qaleh Qazi Rural District, Qaleh Qazi District, Bandar Abbas County, Hormozgan Province, Iran. At the 2006 census, its population was 4,239, in 1,000 families.

References 

Populated places in Bandar Abbas County
Cities in Hormozgan Province